Kynaria cynara is a species of sea slug, an aeolid nudibranch, a marine gastropod mollusc in the family Flabellinidae.

Distribution
This species was described from the Gulf of California. It was redescribed from further material from the Pacific coast of Mexico. It has been reported as far south as Peru.

Description
The description of Flabellina fogata includes a table comparing similar species from Mexico.

References

Flabellinidae
Gastropods described in 1967